is the second single by Japanese act Superfly, released on August 1, 2007. It is the last single to include Koichi Tabo as a member of Superfly. It reached 51st place on the Oricon weekly singles chart and charted for four weeks. A special live version of "Manifesto" from the "13,000 Person Live @ Osaka-jō Hall FM802 Requestage" is an iTunes Store exclusive.

Track listing

References

2007 singles
2007 songs
Japanese-language songs
Superfly (band) songs
Warner Music Japan singles